Vauxhall railway station is a proposed railway station in the Vauxhall area of Liverpool. Construction of the new station was proposed in January 2017 by Mayor of Liverpool Joe Anderson, as part of the city's North Docks project and also Everton Football Club's potential plans to build their new stadium in the area.

References 

Proposed railway stations in Merseyside
Railway stations in Liverpool